Full House was an Armenian sitcom television series developed by Armen Petrosyan. The series premiered on Armenia TV on 4 October 2014 and ended on 5 June 2019. The series takes place in Yerevan, Armenia.

Series overview

Cast and characters

Main characters

Recurring characters (more than one season)
 Marjan Avetisyan portrays Tamara Avetisyan (Seasons 1–9), Authorized person by the owner of "Full House". Tigran and Goharik's aunt, is in love with Mushegh.
 Garik Sephkhanyan portrays Ruben Sepkhanyan (seasons 1–9), "Full House" Cafe's barman, waiter.
 Moso Karapetyan portrays Hrach Gabrielyan (seasons 1–9), Brother of Lika. Lives in United States.
 Lernik Harutyunyan portrays Gagaz (seasons 1–2, 5–8), Yana and Eva's brother.
 Armen Petrosyan portrays Sergey (seasons 1, 3–9), The broker who lied to the boys and girls.
 Chistina Yeghoyan portrays Zara Yeghoyan (seasons 5–9), "Full House" café's waiter.  Tamara's girlfriend's daughter.
 Karine Garsevnyan portrays Margo (seasons 5–6), Mushegh's mother-in-law, Ishkhan's grandmother.
 Mkrtich Arzumanyan portrays Ishkhan (seasons 6–8), The father of Mushegh and the uncle of Felix.
 Ella Tarunts portrays Ella (seasons 1 and 3), Arsen's mother.

Recurring characters (only one season)
 Mariam Melikyan portrays Yana (season 1), Arsen's girlfriend.
 Anati Sakanyan portrays Ruzanna "Ruzan" (season 1), Manager of the "Full House" café.
 Lilit Haroyan portrays Eva (season 2), Lika's girlfriend, whose girls are "used" to control Arsen.
 Adriana Galstyan portrays "Ella" (season 3), A new tenant.
 Eva Khachatryan portrays Nora (season 3), A new tenant.
 Davit Aghajanyan portrays Tigran (season 2), Tamara's nephew. Director of "Full House" café (season 2).
 Marinka Khachatryan portrays Mane Yeranyan (season 4), Tatev's sister, who came from Stepanakert.
 Gevorg Martirosyan portrays Davit (season 4), Mane's boyfriend and classmate.
 Arman Hovhannisyan portrays Ishkhan (season 5), Mushegh's son.
 Lili Karapetyan portrays Lilit (season 5), designer, Felix's classmate and girlfriend.
 Hayk Petrosyan portrays Sevak (season 6), Lika's boyfriend.
 Tamara Petrosyan portrays Nara Isahakovna (season 6), Helps Sergey get Tamara to file for divorce, psychologist-psychotherapist.
 Elen Asatryan portrays Knarik (season 7), reporter
Gosh Hakobyan portrays Gosh (season 7), The boy in the TV series with Tatev
Aghas Manukyan portrays Kamo (season 8–9), Mushegh's driver.
Shogher Tovmasyan portrays Liza (season 8), Hairdresser, Felo's fake girlfriend.
Levon Sargsyan portrays Abulik Yeghoyan (season 8), Zara's brother. The director of a part of "Full House" hotel.
Maga Harutyunyan portrays Nana (season 8), Hairdresser, Lisa's girlfriend.
Arus Tigranyan portrays Goharik (season 9), Tamara's brother's nephew
Jora Hovhannisyan portrays Arin (season 9), A Persian-Armenian who came to Armenia intends to buy a house.
Ani Kocharyan portrays Ruzanna (sesson 9), Zara and Abulik's mother, Ruben's mother-in-law. The director of "Full House" hotel.

Season 1 (2014)
Two student girls decide to rent an apartment. Finding a cheap apartment for rent, they come to an agreement with the real estate agency and pay the 1-year rent. Moving to an apartment, the girls are surprised. Three boys live in that house. It turns out that the same agent, under the same conditions, rented the apartment to those three boys as well. Realizing that the agent had deceived them and that no one was going to leave the apartment, they decided to stay and make the lives of those on the other side unbearable.

Cast

 Grigor Danielyan as Mushegh Danielyan
 Gor Hakobyan as Felix Hakobyan
 Mihran Tsarukyan as Arsen Grigoryan
 Arpi Gabrielyan as Lika Gabrielyan
 Ani Yeranyan as Tatevik Yeranyan

Recurring 

 Marjan Avetisyan as Tamara Avetisyan 
 Garik Sepkhanyan as Ruben
 Moso Karapetyan as Hrach Gabrielyan 
 Anati Sakanyan as Ruzanna
 Mariam Melikyan as Yana
 Lernik Harutyunyan as Gagas

Guest 

 Armen Petrosyan as Sergey (1/1)
 Lucie Hayrapetyan as Sara (1/8-9)
 Varda as himself (1/10)
 Sargis Tashchyan as Samo (1/10)
 Hasmik Abrahamyan as Lilit (1/17)
 Suren Pahlevanyan as Artak (1/18)
 Elizaveta Podobriaeva as Tania (1/19)
 Artsrun Harutyunyan as Mr. Babken (1/21)
 Sargis Grigoryan as himself (1/23)
 Artyom Hakobyan as himself (1/24) 
 Ella Tarunts as Ella (1/25)

Season 2 (2015)
The fight for an apartment continues in Full House. Each side tries to make the other side leave the apartment.

Felix continues to fight for Tatev's love, but there is someone who makes his struggle more difficult.

Tamara continues to pursue Mushegh.

Tamara's nephew Tigran is coming to Armenia, whom her father sent to Armenia to get married.

Arsen decides to put aside his personal life and pursue his own career. But everything changes when Eva appears in her life

Cast

 Grigor Danielyan as Mushegh Danielyan
 Gor Hakobyan as Felix Hakobyan
 Mihran Tsarukyan as Arsen Grigoryan
 Arpi Gabrielyan as Lika Gabrielyan
 Ani Yeranyan as Tatevik Yeranyan

Recurring 

 Marjan Avetisyan as Tamara Avetisyan 
 Garik Sepkhanyan as Ruben
 Moso Karapetyan as Hrach Gabrielyan 
 Davit Aghajanyan as Tigran
 Lilit Haroyan as Eva
 Lernik Harutyunyan as Gagas

Guest 

 Hayk Harutyunyan as himself
 Tsovinar Martirosyan as Melan (2/8)
 Adriana Galstyan as Margarita (2/15)
 Arsen Safaryan as himself (2/17)
 Anna Vanetsyan "Anchok as Ani (2/18)
 Garik Martirosyan as himself (2/20)
 Narek Haykazyan as Vardan (2/21-22)
 Artur Avagyan as pizza's shipper (2/23)

Season 3 (2015)
The rental period of the house expires in one day. The boys have accumulated a lot of money throughout the summer, and so have the girls. They are going to leave the apartment with great joy, because they will finally get rid of each other. However, Tamara understands that if the boys leave the apartment, she will lose her love, Mushegh. That is why he is taking an extreme step. He steals the money they have collected, so that neither the girls nor the boys can leave the apartment.

Cast

 Grigor Danielyan as Mushegh Danielyan
 Gor Hakobyan as Felix Hakobyan
 Mihran Tsarukyan as Arsen Grigoryan
 Arpi Gabrielyan as Lika Gabrielyan
 Ani Yeranyan as Tatevik Yeranyan

Recurring 

 Marjan Avetisyan as Tamara Avetisyan
 Garik Sepkhanyan as Ruben
 Moso Karapetyan as Hrach Gabrielyan 
 Eva Khachatryan as Nora
 Adriana Galstyan as Ella
 Armen Petrosyan as Sergey
 Ella Tarunts as Ella

Guest 

DJ Smoke (3/1)
Martin Mkrtchyan as himself (3/7)
Mkhitar Avetisyan as Vanik (3/17)
Harout Pambukhchyan (Dzakh Harout) as himself (3/21)
Artavazd Yeghoyan as himself (3/21)
Grigor Sukiasyan as Wedding organizer (3/29)
Razmik Amyan as himself (3/29)
Vika Martirosyan as himself (3/29)
Hovhannes Grigoryan as Arkadi (3/31)

Season 4 (2016)
The people of Full House live under one roof and it seems that everything is fine. But it can not last long, because the owner of the apartment has appeared, who wants to sell it. Mrs. Tamara comes to the rescue, who buys the apartment and rents it out to the Fullhousians on other terms. But it is not only that. Tatev's younger sister Mane is coming to Yerevan from Karabakh, who will settle temporarily in Full House. No one can imagine how much a headache Mane can cause for everyone.

Cast

 Grigor Danielyan as Mushegh Danielyan
 Gor Hakobyan as Felix Hakobyan
 Mihran Tsarukyan as Arsen Grigoryan
 Arpi Gabrielyan as Lika Gabrielyan
 Ani Yeranyan as Tatevik Yeranyan

Recurring 

 Marjan Avetisyan as Tamara Avetisyan
 Garik Sepkhanyan as Ruben
 Moso Karapetyan as Hrach Gabrielyan 
 Marinka Khachatryan as Mane Yeranyan
 Gevorg Martirosyan as Davit
 Armen Petrosyan as Sergey

Guest 

 Vladimir Mkhitaryan as Samvel (4/1)
 Armen Dallaqyan as Aram (4/8)
 Karine Khachatryan as Lida (4/8)
 Lala Khachikyan as Varduhi (4/10)
 Hrach Muradyan as himself (4/15)
 Artur Avagyan as operator (4/15)
 Hakob Hakobyan as presenter (4/15)
 Gevorg Kalemdaryan as chugun (4/16)
 Ashot Navasardyan as Vilen (4/18)

Season 5 (2016)
It turns out that the people of Full House accidentally return at the same time and unexpectedly find out that the apartment was bought by Diaspora Armenians. Solving this problem, Tamara hands over the apartment to the Fullhousians again, this time on such terms that the Fulhousians agree to live under the same floor again, except for Mushegh, who wants to leave the apartment at all costs. But Mushegh's son suddenly appears. Meeting his only heir 14 years later, it becomes Mushegh's main task to prove to his son that he can be a caring father.

Cast

 Grigor Danielyan as Mushegh Danielyan
 Gor Hakobyan as Felix Hakobyan
 Mihran Tsarukyan as Arsen Grigoryan
 Arpi Gabrielyan as Lika Gabrielyan
 Ani Yeranyan as Tatevik Yeranyan

Recurring 

 Marjan Avetisyan as Tamara Avetisyan
 Garik Sepkhanyan as Ruben
 Moso Karapetyan as Hrach Gabrielyan 
 Armen Petrosyan as Sergey
 Arman Hovhannisyan as Ishkhanik Danielyan
 Christina Yeghoyan as Zara Yeghoyan
 Lili Karapetyan as Lilit
 Karine Garsevanyan as Margo

Guest 

 Mher Nahapetyan as Sipan (5/1)
 Aram MP3 as himself (5/19)
 Gayane Aslamazyan as Luiza (5/22)
 Lernik Harutyunyan as Gagas (5/23)

Season 6 (2017)
After living with Sergey for months after the marriage and patiently enduring his unbearable whims, Tamara decided to separate from Sergey, sharing with him his property, which amounts to 1 million dollars.

Cast

 Grigor Danielyan as Mushegh Danielyan
 Gor Hakobyan as Felix Hakobyan
 Mihran Tsarukyan as Arsen Grigoryan
 Arpi Gabrielyan as Lika Gabrielyan
 Ani Yeranyan as Tatevik Yeranyan

Recurring
 Marjan Avetisyan as Tamara Avetisyan
 Garik Sephkhanyan as Ruben
 Moso Karapetyan as Hrach Gabrielyan
 Armen Petrosyan as Sergey
 Christina Yeghoyan as Zara Yeghoyan
 Hayk Petrosyan as Sevak
 Tamara Petrosyan as Nara

Guest
 Lernik Harutyunyan as Gagas (6/9,16)
 Arsen Grigoryan (Aso) as himself (6/9)
 Arsen Grigoryan (Mro) as himself (6/9)
 Arsen Grigoryan as himself (6/9)
 Vasil Sargsyan Mr. Grigoryan (6/10)
 Gagik Shamshyan as himself (6/11)
 Mkrtich Arzumanyan as Ishkhan Danielyan (6/13)
 Karine Garsevanyan as Margo (6/15)
 Andranik Hakobyan as Hakob (6/17)
 Sos Janibekyan portrays Mika (6/20)
 Mher Khachatryan portrays Garik (6/20)
 Marieta Khojayan as Silva (6/21)
 Tatev Sargsyan as Inga (6/19,23)
 Artashes Aleksanyan as Sevak's father (6/24)

Season 7 (2017)
After living together for years, this time the Fulhousians were given the opportunity to arrange their lives as they imagined.

Mushegh and Tamara got married secretly from relatives and live carefree in Tamara's house. Unlike Mushegh and Tamara, Felix and Tatev went on a honeymoon after their wedding.

Returning from the tour, Felix and Tatev are surprised to learn that Lika will continue to live in their house.  But this is not the only surprise. In fact, everything turns upside down when Mushegh's father Ishkhan appears and changes the lives of all our heroes.

Cast

 Grigor Danielyan as Mushegh Danielyan
 Gor Hakobyan as Felix Hakobyan
 Mihran Tsarukyan as Arsen Grigoryan
 Arpi Gabrielyan as Lika Gabrielyan
 Ani Yeranyan as Tatevik Yeranyan

Recurring
 Marjan Avetisyan as Tamara Avetisyan
 Garik Sephkhanyan as Ruben
 Christina Yeghoyan as Zara Yeghoyan
 Armen Petrosyan as Sergey
 Mkrtich Arzumanyan as Ishkhan Danielyan 
 Elen Asatryan as Knarik
 Gosh Hakobyan as Gosh
 Moso Karapetyan as Hrach Gabrielyan

Guest
 Erik Karapetyan as himself (7/4)
 Davit Hakobyan as Kima (7/5)
 Karen Boksyan as himself (7/6)
 Hovhannes Hovhannisyan as Onik (7/8)
 Grigor Gabrielyan as Tatev aunt's husband (7/8)
 Vladimir Poghosyan as operator (7/10,21)
 Bosson as himself (7/15)
 Lernik Harutyunyan as Gagas (7/20)
 Seyran Novikyan as Sargis (7/24)

Season 8 (2018) 
Mushegh is already a millionaire and lives in a private house. And Arsen and Lika return. And Felo and Tatev's split up and sell their apartment and Felo opens a hairdressing salon with his own money, and it is in that hairdressing salon that Lisa's character develops. And Zara's father gives them a hotel. Zara also has a stepbrother, Abulik, and Abulik himself is a shareholder in a part of the hotel.

Cast 

 Grigor Danielyan as Mushegh Danielyan
 Gor Hakobyan as Felix Hakobyan
 Mihran Tsarukyan as Arsen Grigoryan
 Arpi Gabrielyan as Lika Gabrielyan

Recurring 

 Marjan Avetisyan as Tamara Avetisyan 
 Garik Sephkhanyan as Ruben
 Christina Yeghoyan as Zara Yeghoyan
 Armen Petrosyan as Sergey
 Moso Karapetyan as Hrach Gabrielyan
 Aghas Manukyan as Kamo
 Shogher Tovmasyan as Liza
 Levon Sargsyan as Abulik Yeghoyan
 Maga Harutyunyan as Nana

Guest 

 Lernik Harutyunyan as Gagas (8/4)
 Spitakci Hayko as himself (8/16)
 Mkrtich Arzumanyan as Ishkhan Danielyan (8/19)

Season 9 (2019) 
It turns out that Mushegh owes a large amount of money to the state and in case of non-payment he will be held criminally liable. Tamara's brother helps Mushegh, but the latter's greed gives way and he loses the whole amount to the casino. The failures follow one another and on the day when everyone has to leave the apartment, Goharik, Sargis's daughter, who has been living in Mushegh and Tamara's house for a long time, suddenly appears. There is a problem to hide the fact of selling the apartment from Goharik.

Cast 

 Grigor Danielyan as Mushegh Danielyan
 Gor Hakobyan as Felix Hakobyan
 Mihran Tsarukyan as Arsen Grigoryan
 Arpi Gabrielyan as Lika Gabrielyan

Recurring 

 Marjan Avetisyan as Tamara Avetisyan
 Garik Sephkhanyan as Ruben
 Christina Yeghoyan as Zara Yeghoyan
 Moso Karapetyan as Hrach Gabrielyan
 Aghas Manukyan as Kamo
 Arus Tigranyan as Goharik
 Jora Hovhannisyan as Arin
 Ani Kocharyan as Ruzanna

Guest 

 Arman Hovhannisyan as himself (9/10)
 DJ Efo as himself (9/10)
 Artur Hakobyan as Bdeshkh (9/16)
Armenchik as himself (9/23)
Silva Hakobyan as himself (9/24)
Anushik Arakelyan as Sona (9/24)
Armen Petrosyan as Sergey (9/24)

Awards and nominations

References

External links
 Full House at the Internet Movie Database

Full House
Armenian comedy television series
Armenian-language television shows
Armenia TV original programming
2010s teen sitcoms
2010s Armenian television series
2014 Armenian television series debuts
2017 Armenian television series endings